Cannabis in Liechtenstein is illegal with severe penalties for the production, sale, and possession of marijuana for medicinal or recreational purposes.

According to the World Drug Report 2011, 8.6% of the population use cannabis at least once per year. A 2016 survey of 15-16-year-old students in Liechtenstein found that 44% had easy access to cannabis.

History
Since a 2005 decree spearheaded by Prince Alois, hemp has been banned for use in feed for cattle, despite claims that it led to more milk being produced since the cows were "less agitated".

References

Liechtenstein
Politics of Liechtenstein
Health in Liechtenstein
Society of Liechtenstein